Henry Stanislas de Lotbiniere Harwood (August 8, 1838 – August 28, 1911) was a landowner and political figure in Quebec. He represented Vaudreuil in the House of Commons of Canada as a Liberal member from 1891 to 1892 and 1893 to 1904.

Born at the Manor of Vaudreuil, Quebec, the eldest son of Robert Unwin Harwood and Marie-Louise-Josephte Chartier de Lotbiniere (1803–1869), Seigneuress of Vaudreuil, the eldest daughter of Michel-Eustache-Gaspard-Alain Chartier de Lotbiniere, de jure 2nd Marquis de Lotbiniere. His brother, Robert William Harwood, had also represented Vaudreuil in the House of Commons and another brother, Antoine Chartier de Lotbiniere Harwood represented Vaudreuil in the Quebec Assembly. He was a nephew of Pierre-Gustave Joly de Lotbinière and a first cousin of Sir Henri-Gustave Joly de Lotbiniere, Prime Minister of Quebec. His brother-in-law, Sir Henri-Elzear Taschereau, was Chief Justice of Canada.

He was educated at the Collège Sainte-Marie de Montréal, and afterwards at the Université Laval, Quebec City. He was the co-seigneur of Vaudreuil and became the Provincial land surveyor, later serving as the Mayor of Vaudreuil. His Parliamentary election in 1892 was declared invalid and Hugh McMillan was elected in the by-election that followed; after an appeal, another by-election was held and Harwood was elected by acclamation. In 1864, he married Marie-Josephine Sydney (1840-1912), daughter of Jean-Chrysostome Brauneis II (1814–1871), organist, composer and teacher - the first Canadian to study music in Europe (1830–33). They were the parents of Louis de Lotbiniere-Harwood and Josephine, the wife of William Rafael Kappelle de Kappelle, Count de Kappelle, of Belgium.

External links 
Mrs Maria (Brauneis) Harwood, 1877
Records of the de Lotbiniere Harwoods of Vaudreuil

References 

1838 births
1911 deaths
Liberal Party of Canada MPs
Members of the House of Commons of Canada from Quebec
Mayors of places in Quebec